The Prix Victor-Barbeau is a Québécois literary prize awarded each year to an author for an essay which is judged to be of very high quality by a jury made up of three members from the Académie des lettres du Québec.

List of Winners

References

External links
Official Site

Culture of Quebec
French-language literature in Canada
Canadian non-fiction literary awards